Llanbradach Quarry is a Site of Special Scientific Interest in Caerphilly County Borough, south Wales.

See also
List of Sites of Special Scientific Interest in Mid & South Glamorgan

Sites of Special Scientific Interest in Caerphilly County Borough
Quarries in Wales